Shorea rubella (called, along with some other species in the genus Shorea, light red meranti) is a species of tree in the family Dipterocarpaceae. It is endemic to Borneo.

References

rubella
Endemic flora of Borneo
Trees of Borneo
Taxonomy articles created by Polbot